Tek or TEK may refer to:

Science and technology
Test of Economic Knowledge (TEK), a standardized test of economics
Traditional ecological knowledge or Traditional Environmental Knowledge (TEK), aboriginal, indigenous, or other forms of traditional knowledges regarding sustainability of local resources
TEK tyrosine kinase, a protein encoded by the TEK gene
Session key or traffic encryption key (TEK)
TEK search engine ("Time Equals Knowledge"), an email-based search engine

People
Tek (rapper) (real name Tekomin Williams, born 1973), a member of the hip-hop group Smif-N-Wessun
Jason Varitek, a former baseball catcher for the Boston Red Sox
Chris O'Ryan, a Grammy Award-winning Australian music producer and sound engineer

Other
Tektronix, or Tek, an American company
Terrorelhárítási Központ (TEK, Counter Terrorism Centre), Hungarian counter-terrorism & SWAT state agency
Tekniikan Akateemiset (TEK), the Finnish Association of Graduate Engineers
Társadalomelméleti Kollégium, College for Advanced Studies in Social Theory, a college in Hungary
 Tengzhou East railway station, China Railway telegraph code TEK
Tek, a fictional substance in the TekWar universe

See also
TEC-9 9mm firearm
Technician
Tech (disambiguation)
Technology